Vincent Michael "Vin" Mazzaro (born September 27, 1986) is an American professional baseball pitcher for the New Jersey Jackals of the Frontier League. He played in Major League Baseball (MLB) for the Oakland Athletics, Kansas City Royals, Pittsburgh Pirates, Miami Marlins and San Francisco Giants.

Early years
Mazzaro grew up in Rutherford, New Jersey, and attended Rutherford High School, where he led the team to two consecutive state championships.

Professional career

Oakland Athletics
Mazzaro was drafted by the Oakland Athletics in the third round of the 2005 Major League Baseball Draft.

In December 2008, Baseball America named Mazzaro the #8 prospect in Oakland's organization.

Mazzaro made his major league debut on June 2,  against the Chicago White Sox. He earned the victory after pitching  innings without allowing a run.

Kansas City Royals
Mazzaro was traded along with minor league pitcher Justin Marks to the Kansas City Royals for David DeJesus on November 10, 2010. After starting the 2011 season with the Omaha Storm Chasers, he was recalled by the Royals to replace the injured Bruce Chen on May 10.

He surrendered 14 runs in  innings in an emergency appearance out of the bullpen in a 19–1 loss to the Cleveland Indians at Kauffman Stadium on May 16, 2011. Besides setting a new franchise record for most runs yielded in a game, he became the first pitcher in the modern era (since 1900) to allow that many without pitching 3 innings. His 14 earned runs given up was also the most by a relief pitcher since Les McCrabb of the Philadelphia Athletics allowed the same amount in four innings in a 19–4 defeat to the Boston Red Sox on April 16, 1942. Originally scheduled to be the starter the following night, Mazzaro was optioned back to the Storm Chasers after the game. Mazzaro was called back to Kansas City on June 7 after Royals starting pitcher Sean O'Sullivan was placed on the disabled list. The following year, he finished the season with an overall record of 4–3 with a 5.73 ERA in 18 games, primarily in relief.
On November 20, 2012, the Royals designated Mazzaro for assignment as they cleared room on the 40-man roster ahead of the Rule 5 draft.

Pittsburgh Pirates
On November 28, 2012, Mazzaro was traded to the Pittsburgh Pirates with first baseman Clint Robinson in exchange for right-handed pitcher Luis Santos and left-hander Luis Rico. Santos and Rico both pitched in the Dominican Summer League in 2012.

Mazzaro was designated for assignment on March 29, 2014, and assigned outright to the Triple-A Indianapolis Indians on April 8.

On May 26, 2014, Mazzaro was designated for assignment again in order for Brandon Cumpton to be called up. He elected free agency in October 2014.

Miami Marlins
On January 21, 2015, the Miami Marlins announced that they had signed Mazzaro to a minor league deal. He split 21 games between Miami and the New Orleans Zephyrs.

Atlanta Braves
Mazzaro signed a minor league deal with the Atlanta Braves on July 10, 2015. He was assigned to the Gwinnett Braves.

San Francisco Giants
Mazzaro signed a minor league deal with the San Francisco Giants on January 11, 2016. On April 30, 2016, Mazzaro was called to the major league roster in order to replace the struggling Mike Broadway. On May 5, 2016, Mazzaro gave up nine runs, while pitching 1/3 of an inning against the Colorado Rockies. Then next day he was designated for assignment to make room for Albert Suarez.

Somerset Patriots
On May 9, 2017, Mazzaro signed with the Somerset Patriots of the Atlantic League of Professional Baseball.

Cincinnati Reds
Mazzaro signed a minor league deal with the Cincinnati Reds on May 18, 2017. He elected free agency on November 6, 2017.

New Jersey Jackals
On May 6, 2018, Mazzaro signed with the New Jersey Jackals of the independent Can-Am League.

Long Island Ducks
On April 9, 2019, Mazzaro was traded to the Long Island Ducks of the Atlantic League of Professional Baseball. He won the 2019 ALPB championship with Long Island. He re-signed with the Ducks for the 2020 season on February 18, 2020. Mazzaro did not play in a game in for the team due to the cancellation of the 2020 ALPB season because of the COVID-19 pandemic and became a free agent after the year. On April 20, 2021, Mazzaro re-signed with the Ducks for the 2021 season. Mazzaro retired from professional baseball on September 9, 2021.

Sussex County Miners
On May 6, 2022, Mazzaro came out of retirement and signed with the Sussex County Miners of the Frontier League.

New Jersey Jackals (second stint)
On December 21, 2022, Mazzaro signed with the New Jersey Jackals of the Frontier League.

References

External links

1986 births
Living people
Baseball players from New Jersey
Indianapolis Indians players
Kane County Cougars players
Kansas City Royals players
Long Island Ducks players
Louisville Bats players
Major League Baseball pitchers
Miami Marlins players
Midland RockHounds players
New Jersey Jackals players
New Orleans Zephyrs players
Oakland Athletics players
Omaha Storm Chasers players
People from Rutherford, New Jersey
Pittsburgh Pirates players
Rutherford High School (New Jersey) alumni
Sacramento River Cats players
San Francisco Giants players
Somerset Patriots players
Sportspeople from Bergen County, New Jersey
Stockton Ports players